Tommaso Boggio (22 December 1877 – 25 May 1963) was an Italian mathematician. Boggio worked in mathematical physics, differential geometry, analysis, and financial mathematics. He was an invited speaker in International Congress of Mathematicians 1908 in Rome. He wrote, with Burali-Forti, Meccanica Razionale, published in 1921 by S. Lattes & Compagnia.

Notes

External links

An Italian short biography of Tommaso Boggio at the University of Turin

1877 births
1963 deaths
19th-century Italian mathematicians
20th-century Italian mathematicians
Mathematical analysts
Scientists from Turin
Academic staff of the University of Turin
Academic staff of the University of Genoa